Erythromyces is a genus of fungi in the family Hymenochaetaceae. It currently contains only the type species, Erythromyces crocicreas.

References

Hymenochaetaceae
Monotypic Basidiomycota genera